Rhinocolura is a monotypic genus of planthoppers belonging to the family Achilidae. The only species is Rhinocolura championi.

References

Achilidae